Robert F. Kennedy Community High School is a community public high school, residing in District 25 of the neighborhood of Kew Gardens Hills in Queens, NY. According to the New York City Board of Education, there are currently 731 students in enrollment.

Athletic Program 
RFK High runs an interscholastic program in the following sports:

Girls' Basketball
co-Ed bowling
 Girls' Volleyball
 Co-Ed Fencing
 Boys' Basketball
 * Girls' Tennis
 Co-Ed Golf
 Baseball
 Softball

See also
 List of high schools in New York City – Queens

References

External links 
 RFK Community High School website
 NYC Department of Education portal site

Public high schools in Queens, New York
Flushing, Queens
1992 establishments in New York City